James Bloomer (10 April 1926 – 7 December 2011) was a Scottish professional footballer who played as an inside forward. His son, also named Jimmy, also played for Grimsby Town.

References

1926 births
2011 deaths
Sportspeople from Rutherglen
Scottish footballers
Association football inside forwards
Strathclyde F.C. players
Hull City A.F.C. players
Grimsby Town F.C. players
King's Lynn F.C. players
English Football League players
Footballers from South Lanarkshire